Stronger is the sixth studio album by American R&B recording artist Tank. The album was released on August 12, 2014, by Atlantic Records. The album was supported by the single "You're My Star". The album debuted at number 13 on the Billboard 200 chart, selling 16,621 copies in its first week of release.

Background
In June 2014, in an interview with Ebony, Tank explained the album title, saying: "Musically, it leans to my strengths as a musician; as a singer; as a songwriter; as the entertainer I’ve always wanted to be. This album is freedom to me. I’m not compromising being talented, [and] I’m not apologizing for the gifts God has given me. On the flip side, from a spiritual and mental standpoint I’ve had to go through a lot in the last few years to get to a space where I am this happy or this excited about my life and where it’s going."

He also spoke about the song "Hope This Makes You Love Me", saying: "I have a record on this album that’s extremely special. It’s called “I Hope This Makes You Love Me.” This record just speaks to the idea of how we try to barter for love. How we, in a sense, try to pay for it—like to love a person and to not get [love] in return, or the same love in return and how far we’re willing to go to have that love reciprocated the way we want it to be. It's like we do anything for it, and at the end of the day, it's just in hope of being loved in return. This song is an experience."

In August 2014, in an interview with Vibe, he spoke about what he did differently on the album, saying: "I added a lot more of the original retro sound of R&B to this album, all the way through and through. I really wanted to pay homage to that sound and what I do as a musician, as a true vocalist, as a songwriter and really let people experience that side of me 100 percent. Coming off the TGT album, I saw that there was still a need for real R&B music, and nobody’s really throwing that out there. This album is leaning towards my strengths and what I do well." He also spoke about why the album doesn't have any features, saying: "I’m not really a feature-heavy guy anyway. When I have a vision, I like to see it all the way through, you know? Sometimes I feel like if a feature is going to interrupt that vision and it's not going to really speak to the song the way I need it to, then I’d rather just be without it. I don’t do features just to do features that put hot people on one song. That’s a way of doing things, but it's not my way."

Singles
On March 11, 2014, the album's first single, "You're My Star" was released. On June 10, 2014, the music video was released for "You're My Star". He spoke about the song, saying: "The song wasn’t written for anybody in particular, it was just [written] for all women period. I get so irritated with women being called b*tches and hoes on songs, and those songs climbing to number one—you know, those songs just being the barometer by which all records are measured. [It’s] disappointing that my record doesn’t have this disrespectful shock value that [makes] you [not] want to play it on your big station. You need something degrading and defiling to gain listeners. We gotta change that. For all the records that are calling [women] out of [their] name, this record is going to mention who you really are: you’re a star, [and] you’re appreciated."

Critical response

Andy Kellman of AllMusic said, "Durrell Babbs was rolling as smoothly as ever in 2014. This Is How I Feel, his fifth album, had gone Top Ten, while the product of his collaboration with Tyrese and Ginuwine, as TGT, debuted at number three and was Grammy-nominated for Best R&B Album. Though his adequate and sometimes brow-raising sixth album might seem fittingly titled, it's more descriptive of his career than of the content. "Stronger" itself, one of his best ballads, regards perseverance and devotion, yet Last Ditch Attempts would be a more descriptive title for an album with desperate expressions like "I'll come to his house and help you pack your bags" and "'Cause I'm praying now/I give to the homeless now."

Commercial performance
The album debuted at number 13 on the Billboard 200, with first-week sales of 16,621 copies in the United States. In its second week, the album sold 6,151 more copies bringing its total album sales to 22,772.

Controversy
Due to the album's low sales, Atlantic stopped all promotion for the album- including the release of what would have been the second single "Stronger". As a result, Tank went to Instagram in December 2014 to rant about his displeasure of the album's failure by blaming it on the fans. His rant included the statement “Maybe I should have been born white then all my music would go straight to mainstream" - referencing Sam Smith and Adele's success on urban radio. Tank also criticized the music industry, the lack of musicianship and whether he should continue doing rhythm and blues. He later concluded his rant by ending with the following statement:

"What I do know is that i will not continue to be faithful to something or someone that is not being faithful to me. I love you but I have a family. I have a mom and dad just like you. I have goals and dreams just like you. I refuse to work hard for nothing. I look better, sing better, produce better, write better, and perform better than dam near everybody and this is the thanks I get?.. Again I’m not angry I’m just tired.. Please enjoy my last real R&B album “Stronger” cause you’ll never get another one!"

Track listing

Charts

Weekly charts

Year-end charts

References

2014 albums
Tank (American singer) albums
Albums produced by Da Internz
Atlantic Records albums